Martin Nagy (born 5 September 1990) is a Slovak footballer who most recently played as a midfielder for Skalica.

Ružomberok
Martin made his official debut for Ružomberok on 21 May 2011, coming in as a substitute in a 3–2 home win against Senica.

External links 
 MFK Ružomberok profile
 
 Eurofotbal.cz profile

References

1990 births
Living people
Association football midfielders
Slovak footballers
MFK Ružomberok players
Slovak Super Liga players
Hungarians in Slovakia
People from Skalica District
Sportspeople from the Trnava Region